Domagoj Bešlić (born 1 December 1990 in Zagreb) is a Croatian football player currently playing for SV Gleinstätten in the Landesliga Steiermark.

Club career 
In 2010, he played in the Canadian Soccer League with Brantford Galaxy. He would later play with league rivalsHamilton Croatia for the remainder of the season. He returned to Europe in 2011 to play in the Croatian Second Football League with NK Sesvete. In 2015, he played in the Austria First League with SK Austria Klagenfurt. The following season he played with TSV Hartberg. 

In 2016, he moved to SC Fürstenfeld. After a season with Fürstenfeld he returned to SV Lafnitz in the winter of 2017. In 2019, he departed from Lafnitz, and returned to SC Fürstenfeld. In the winter of 2023, he signed a contract with SV Gleinstätten.

Honours

Club
SV Lafnitz
Austrian Regionalliga Central (1) 2017-18

References

External links 

1990 births
Living people
Footballers from Zagreb
Association football forwards
Croatian footballers
NK Vinogradar players
Brantford Galaxy players
Hamilton Croatia players
NK Vrapče players
NK Sesvete players
SV Lafnitz players
SK Austria Klagenfurt players
TSV Hartberg players
First Football League (Croatia) players
Canadian Soccer League (1998–present) players
Austrian Landesliga players
Austrian Regionalliga players
2. Liga (Austria) players
Croatian expatriate footballers
Expatriate soccer players in Canada
Croatian expatriate sportspeople in Canada
Expatriate footballers in Austria
Croatian expatriate sportspeople in Austria